The barred topminnow (Quintana atrizona) is a species of poeciliid fish endemic to Cuba where it prefers patches of aquatic vegetation in ponds.

References

Poeciliidae
Endemic fauna of Cuba
Freshwater fish of Cuba
Fish described in 1934
Taxa named by Carl Leavitt Hubbs